Ngombe may refer to:

Ngombe language, a Bantu language spoken in the Democratic Republic of Congo
a population of the Bangandu language spoken in the Central African Republic
William II of Bimbia (birth name Ngombe), 19th-century Cameroonian king